Megachile bridarollii is a species of bee in the family Megachilidae. It was described by Moure in 1947.

References

Bridarollii
Insects described in 1947